"Life" is a song written and originally recorded by Shirl Milete in 1969. Elvis Presley recorded the song on June 6, 1970. Presley's version was released as single, peaking at No. 53 on the Billboard Hot 100, No. 8 on the Easy Listening chart, and No. 34 on the Country Singles chart. It was a double A-side with "Only Believe". It was included on Presley's Love Letters from Elvis album.

Critical response  
Billboard reviewed the single "Life/Only Believe" in its May 8, 1971, issue. The magazine characterizes the song "Life" as "a gospel-oriented ballad that builds into a heavy production."

References

1969 songs
1971 singles
Elvis Presley songs
Song recordings produced by Felton Jarvis
RCA Records singles
Rock ballads
1970s ballads